Fr. Alonso de Ovalle (Santiago; July 27, 1603 – Lima; May 1651) was a Chilean Jesuit priest and chronicler of Chilean history, author of the Historica relacion del Reyno de Chile y de las missiones y ministerios que exercita en él la Compañía de Jesus, describing the Conquest of Chile and the Arauco War. He was great grandson of the Genoese sailor Juan Bautista Pastene.

Sources
 Alonso de Ovalle, Historica relacion del Reyno de Chile y de las missiones y ministerios que exercita en él la Compañía de Jesus, Roma : Por Francisco Cavallo, 1646.  Biblioteca Nacional

References

1603 births
1651 deaths
Jesuit historians and chroniclers
Chilean historians
17th-century Chilean Jesuits
Chroniclers
17th-century Chilean historians
Chilean people of Italian descent